Luke Bullen (born 9 February 1973 in Norwich, England) is an English drummer and percussionist. Bullen studied at London drum school Drumtech and joined the band Addict in 1995; the band was signed to V2 Records in 1996. Bullen left Addict in 2000 and formed Zanderman with Addict's lead singer Mark Aston.

In 2001, Bullen joined Joe Strummer and the Mescaleros to promote the newly released studio album Global a Go-Go. He performed drums for Scottish singer-songwriter KT Tunstall, and was romantically involved with the singer.

On Christmas Day, 2007, Bullen proposed to Tunstall, and the couple were married on the Isle of Skye on 6 September 2008. However, they separated in 2012, and in May 2013 they were divorced.

References

External links
 Artist bio

1973 births
Living people
Musicians from Norwich
English drummers
British male drummers
21st-century drummers
21st-century British male musicians
The Mescaleros members